Lasionycta alpicola is a moth of the family Noctuidae. It is found in the South Siberian Mountains.

External links
Checklist of Hadeninae of Russia

Lasionycta
Moths described in 1988